This is the complete list of Individual Long Track World Championship medalists from 1971. Also included are the medalists from 1957 to 1970 when the championship was known as the European Individual Long Track Championship.

Medalists

European Long Track Championship

(*) Shows position was gained after a run-off.

World Long Track Championship

Grand Prix Series (since 1997)

Riders
There have been 369 competitors from 22 countries.

Records
 Most Appearances in Final: Gerd Riss 25.
 Most Overall Points: Theo Pijper 1340.
 Most One Day Finals: Egon Müller 20.
 Most One Day Points: Karl Maier 329.
 Most Grand-Prix Series Appearances: Theo Pijper 23.
 Most Grand-Prix Appearances: Theo Pijper 98.
 Most Grand-Prix Points: Theo Pijper 1340.
 Most Grand-Prix Podiums Mathieu Trésarrieu 34.
 Most Grand-Prix Wins Gerd Riss & Joonas Kylmäkorpi 16

See also
 Motorcycle speedway
 Team Long Track World Championship

References

Books

External links
 GrasstrackGB

Motorcycle speedway